Stipe Radić  (born 10 June 2000) is a Croatian professional footballer who plays as a centre-back for Fortuna Sittard.

Career
Radić started his senior career with Hajduk Split II in the Croatian Second Football League, before being promoted to the main team roster in late 2019. He wanted to leave Belgian side Beerschot after they got relegated in summer 2022, but was not allowed to by the club and he disappeared to Croatia and later the Netherlands. On 14 December 2022, Radić signed for Eredivisie club Fortuna Sittard on a contract until June 2024.

References

External links
 
 HNS Profile
 WUNDERKIND: STIPE RADIĆ 'It's a phenomenal feeling to wear a jersey and be the captain of Hajduk, and in the distant future I would like to have a career like Raphael Varane'
 Who is the new Hajduk stopper? He started in Solin as a striker, and now he is watching Ramos' videos

2000 births
Living people
Footballers from Split, Croatia
Association football central defenders
Croatian footballers
Croatia youth international footballers
HNK Hajduk Split II players
HNK Hajduk Split players
K Beerschot VA players
Fortuna Sittard players
First Football League (Croatia) players
Croatian Football League players
Belgian Pro League players
Croatian expatriate footballers
Expatriate footballers in Belgium
Croatian expatriate sportspeople in Belgium
Expatriate footballers in the Netherlands
Croatian expatriate sportspeople in the Netherlands